Heinrich Brunner (21 June 1840 – 11 August 1915) was a  German historian.

Life
Brunner was born at Wels in Upper Austria. After studying at the universities of Vienna, Göttingen and Berlin, he became professor at the University of Lemberg in 1866, and in quick succession held similar positions at Prague, Strasbourg and Berlin.

From 1872 Brunner devoted himself especially to studying the early laws and institutions of the Franks and other antique peoples of Western Europe. He also became a leading authority on modern German law. He became a member of the Berlin Academy of Sciences in 1884, and in 1887, after the death of Georg Waitz, undertook the supervision of the Leges section of the Monumenta Germaniae Historica (MGH).

Brunner stayed with the MGH until his death in 1915. This was the first time that a legal scholar led a section of the MGH; Brunner oversaw an extensive overhaul of the section's program (the re-editing of the Capitularia and the Lex Alamannorum, then the Lex Burgundionum, and finally the Lex Baiuvariorum).

Works
Brunner wrote:

Die Entstehung der Schwurgerichte (Berlin, 1872)
Zeugen und Inquisitionsbeweis der karolingischen Zeit (Vienna, 1866)
Das anglonormannische Erbfolgesystem. Ein Beitrag zur Parentelenordnung nebst einem Exkurs über die älteren normannischen Coutumes (Leipzig, 1869)
Zur Rechtsgeschichte der römischen und germanischen Urkunde (Berlin, 1880)
Deutsche Rechtsgeschichte (Leipzig, 1887–1892)
Mithio und Sperantes (Berlin, 1885)
Die Landschenkungen der Merowinger und Agilolfinger (Berlin, 1885)
Die Herkunft der Schoeffen (Berlin, 1888) [transl: The Origin of the Echevin]Das Gerichtszeugnis und die fränkische Königsurkunde (Berlin, 1873)Forschungen zur Geschichte des deutschen und franzsöschen Rechts (Stuttgart, 1894)Grundzüge der deutschen Rechtsgeschichte (Leipzig, 1901)

He is also the author of the German versions of The Sources of English Law''.

References 

Attribution

External links
 
 Source index to Heinrich Brunner's "Deutsche Rechtsgeschichte" (University of Cologne, Project "Edition of the Frankish Capitularies")

1840 births
1915 deaths
19th-century German historians
20th-century German historians
Academic staff of Charles University
German expatriates in the Czech lands
German people of Austrian descent
Germanic studies scholars
Humboldt University of Berlin alumni
Academic staff of the Humboldt University of Berlin
Members of the Prussian House of Lords
People from Wels
Recipients of the Pour le Mérite (civil class)
University of Göttingen alumni
Academic staff of the University of Strasbourg
University of Vienna alumni